Scott Warren Siegel (born 1951) is a US writer of mostly young adult shared universe science-fiction and fantasy, generally with his wife Barbara Siegel. Many of their novels were published in the 1980s and 1990s. In later years, he and his wife turned to writing related to the theatre and film.

Bibliography

Fiction
Dark Forces (novel series): 
The Companion (1983) 
Beat the Devil (1983).
Twistaplot: Ghost Riders of Goldspur (1985), with Barbara Siegel. 
Preludes (Dragonlance series): Tanis, the Shadow Years (1990) with Barbara Siegel
Find Your Fate: James Bond in Strike it Deadly (1985) with Barbara Siegel 
G.I. Joe: Find Your Fate
6 Operation: Death Stone (1986) with Barbara Siegel
13 Operation: Snow Job (1987) with Barbara Siegel 
17 Operation: Sink or Swim (1987) with Barbara Siegel 
Fire Brats
1 The Burning Land (1987) with Barbara Siegel
2 Survivors (1987) with Barbara Siegel
3 Thunder Mountain (1987) with Barbara Siegel
4 Shockwave (1988) with Barbara Siegel
Ghostworld
1 Beyond Terror (1991) with Barbara Siegel
2 Midnight Chill (1991) with Barbara Siegel
3 Dark Fire (1992) with Barbara Siegel
4 Cold Dread (1992) with Barbara Siegel
5 Fatal Fear (1992) with Barbara Siegel
6 Final Frenzy (1993) with Barbara Siegel
Wizards, Warriors and You
6 Revenge of the Falcon Knight (1985)
12 The Scarlet Shield of Shalimar (1986) with Barbara Siegel
18 Warrior Women of Weymouth (1986) with Barbara Siegel
Star Trek: Phaser Fight (1986) with Barbara Siegel
Junior Transformers: Battle Drive * (1985)
Which Way Books: The Champion of TV Wrestling * (1986)

Shortfiction
The Blood Sea Monster (1987) with Barbara Siegel
The Storyteller (1987) with Barbara Siegel
A Painter's Vision (1987) with Barbara Siegel

Anthologies
Tales from Tethedril (1998)

Non Fiction
The Winona Ryder Scrapbook (1997) with Barbara Siegel
Introduction (Tales from Tethedril) (1998) 
The Encyclopedia of Hollywood (1990)

References

External links

1951 births
American male novelists
American science fiction writers
Living people